The 1993–94 Courage League National Division Three was the seventh full season of rugby union within the third tier of the English league system, currently known as National League 1. Following a reduction in size of the top four divisions of the league from thirteen to ten, the teams now play each other twice, home and away instead of just once.

Following their relegation last season, Coventry won the division and return to National Division Two for next season. They are joined by the runner-up, Fylde, who were also relegated last season. Havant and Redruth are both relegated to National Four. Havant were runners-up last season and would have been promoted to National Division Two if the leagues had not been re-organised.

Participating teams and locations 

Owing to a reduction from thirteen teams to ten in the top four divisions of the national leagues, only three teams participated in National Division Three last season, Exeter, Havant and Redruth. The remaining seven teams all played in National Division Two last season.

League table

Sponsorship
National Division Three is part of the Courage Clubs Championship and is sponsored by Courage Brewery.

See also
 English Rugby Union Leagues
 English rugby union system
 Rugby union in England

References

N3
National League 1 seasons